Paruthiapparkoil is a village in the Orathanadu taluk of Thanjavur district, Tamil Nadu, India.

Demographics 

As per the 2001 census, Paruthiapparkoil had a total population of 677 with 330 males and 347 females. The sex ratio was 1052. The literacy rate was 71.69℅.

References 

 

Villages in Thanjavur district